Kosher Kitty Kelly is a 1926 American silent comedy drama film directed by James W. Horne, produced by Joseph P. Kennedy, Sr. (Robertson-Cole), and distributed by Film Booking Offices of America (FBO). Based on the stage musical Kosher Kitty Kelly by Leon De Costa, the film stars Viola Dana.

Cast

Preservation
A print of Kosher Kitty Kelly is preserved at the Library of Congress but is missing a reel.

References

External links
 
Kosher Kitty Kelly at IMDb.com
Kosher Kitty Kelly; allmovie / synopsis
line drawn lobby poster advertisement

1926 films
American silent feature films
Films directed by James W. Horne
American films based on plays
1926 comedy-drama films
1920s English-language films
Film Booking Offices of America films
American black-and-white films
Films with screenplays by Gerald Duffy
1920s American films
Silent American comedy-drama films